Kasatkia is a genus of marine ray-finned fishes belonging to the family Stichaeidae, the pricklebacks or shannies. These fishes are found in the North Pacific Ocean.

Taxonomy
Kasatkia was first proposed as a monospecific genus in 1916 by the Russian zoologists Vladimir Soldatov and Mikhail Nikolaevich Pavlenko when the described Kasatkia memorabilis from south of Cape Gamov in the Sea of Japan. In 1999 a second species, the six-spot prickelback (K. seigeli) was described from California. The genus is placed in the subfamily Opisthocentrinae within the family Stichaeidae by some authorities, while other classify this taxon as a valid family, Opisthocentridae. Kasatkia is considered to be closely related to Askoldia.

Etymology
Kasatkia means belonging to Kasatka, the name of the vessel that Soldatov and Pavlenko used to carry out studies on the salmon of the Amur River.

Species
Kasatkia contains the following species:

Characteristics
Kasatkia pricklebacks have, like other Stichaeids, an elongated, eel-like body. They may have a scaled head, although the extent of the covering of scales appears to vary individually and they mau be absent. They presence of pelvic fins also seems to vary within the species. They are separated from Askoldia by having 7 sensory pores in a sensory canal situated between their eyes.

Distribution and habitat
Kasatkia pricklebacks are found in the North Pacific Ocean off eastern Asia and western North America.

References

Opisthocentrinae